Minna is a feminine name of Germanic origin, meaning courtly love, and is also a diminutive of Wilhelmina. It is now particularly known in Finland and Sweden.

Notable people

A–F
 Minna Aalto (born 1965), Finnish sport sailor
 Minna Aaltonen (1966–2021), Finnish actress
 Minna Antrim (1861–1950), American writer
 Minna Arve (born 1974), Finnish politician
 Minna Atherton (born 2000), Australian competitive swimmer
 Minna Beckmann-Tube (1881–1964), German painter and opera singer, and wife of Max Beckmann
 Minna Canth (1844–1897), Finnish writer and social activist
 Minna Carleton (1847–1918), English novelist
 Minna Cauer (1841–1922), German educator, journalist and radical activist
 Minna Citron (1896–1991), American painter and printmaker
 Minna Cowan (1878–1951), British political activist
 Minna Craucher (1891–1932), Finnish socialite and spy
 Minna Everleigh (1866–1948), American brothel owner
 Minna Fernald (1860–1954), American botanical artist
 Minna Flake (1886–1958), German physician and socialist

G–M
 Minna Gale (1869–1944), American stage and film actress
 Minna Gombell (1892–1973), American stage and film actress
 Minna Grey (1868–1935), English film actress
 Minna Haapkylä (born 1973), Finnish film actress
 Minna B. Hall, American socialite and environmentalist
 Minna Harkavy (1887–1987), Estonian-American sculptor
 Minna Heponiemi (born 1977), Swedish footballer
 Minna Herzlieb (1789–1865), German publisher
 Minna Hesso (born 1976), Finnish snowboarder
 Minna Jørgensen (1904–1975), Danish film actress
 Minna Karhu (born 1971), Finnish freestyle skier
 Minna Kauppi (born 1982), Finnish orienteer 
 Minna Keal (1909–1999), British composer
 Minna Keene (1861–1943), German-Canadian portrait photographer
 Minna Kleeberg (1841–1878), German-American poet 
 Minna Lachs (1907–1993), Austrian educator and memoirist
 Minna Lammert or Tamm (1852–1921), German operatic mezzo-soprano
 Minna Lederman (1896–1995), American music writer and editor
 Minna Lehtola (born 1967), Finnish fencer
 Minna Lewinson (1897–1938), American journalist
 Minna Lindgren (born 1963), Finnish writer and journalist
 Minna Meriluoto (born 1985), Finnish football goalkeeper

N–Z
 Minna Nieminen (born 1976), Finnish rower 
 Minna Nikkanen (born 1988), Finnish pole vaulter
 Minna Nystedt (born 1967), Norwegian speed skater
 Minna Painilainen-Soon (born 1964), Finnish sprinter
 Minna Palmroth, Finnish professor in computational space physics
 Minna Peschka-Leutner (1839–1890), Austrian opera singer
 Minna Planer (1809–1866), German actress and first wife of Richard Wagner
 Minna Rozen (born 1947), Israeli professor of Jewish history
 Minna Salami (born 1978), Finnish Nigerian journalist
 Minna Salmela (born 1971), Finnish freestyle sprint swimmer
 Minna Sirnö (born 1966), Finnish politician
 Minna Specht (1879–1961), German educator and socialist
 Minna Stocks (1846–1928), German painter
 Minna Sundberg (born 1990), Finnish illustrator and cartoonist
 Minna Telde (born 1974), Swedish horse rider
 Minna Turunen (born 1969), Finnish TV and film actress
 Minna Vehmasto (born 1962), Finnish high jumper
 Minna Weizmann (1889–?), Russian Jewish doctor
 Minna Wetlesen (1821–1891), Norwegian educator, teacher and author
 Minna Wettstein-Adelt (1869–c.1908), German-French journalist and writer 
 Minna of Worms (died 1096), Jewish martyr

Fictional characters
 Minna Troil, a leading character in Walter Scott's novel The Pirate
 Minna-Dietlinde Wilcke, a major character in the media franchise Strike Witches

References

Finnish feminine given names